Walking with the Beggar Boys is the 2004 release by indie rock band Elf Power.

It has a more Southern rock-influenced sound than its more psychedelic predecessors.

"Never Believe" was released as a single prior to the album's release, and a video was created as well.

Vic Chestnutt was featured on the title track, singing and playing guitar.

Track listing
"Never Believe"
"Walking with the Beggar Boys"
"Drawing Flies"
"The Stranger"
"Hole in My Shoe"
"The Cracks"
"Evil Eye"
"Don't Let It Be"
"Invisible Men"
"Empty Pictures"
"Big Thing"

References

2004 albums
Elf Power albums